The White Book of the Purge was a 1934 book published by German émigrés in Paris about the Nazi purge known as the Night of the Long Knives. It named 116 people who had been killed in the purge, asserting that 401 in total had died.

References

History books about Nazi Germany
1934 non-fiction books
Night of the Long Knives